Jair or Jahir is a male given name. It is derived from Hebrew יָאִיר (Yair) meaning "he shines". It may refer to the following people:

People

Given name
Jair
 Jair of Manasseh, biblical leader and homesteader
Jair Baylón (born 1989), Peruvian footballer 
Jair Benítez (born 1979), Colombian footballer
Jair Bernal (born 1968), Colombian road cyclist 
Jair Bolsonaro (born 1955), 38th President of Brazil
Jair Braga (born 1954), Brazilian cyclist
Jair Córdova (born 1996), Peruvian footballer
Jair da Costa (born 1940), Brazilian footballer 
Jair Céspedes (born 1984), Peruvian footballer 
Jair Eduardo Britto da Silva (born 1988), Brazilian football player
Jair García (born 1978), Mexican footballer 
Jair Gonçalves Prates (born 1953), Brazilian football player 
Jair Iglesias (born 1981), Peruvian footballer
Jair Jurrjens (born 1986), Curaçaoan baseball pitcher 
Jair Lynch (born 1971), American gymnast 
Jair Marinho de Oliveira (born 1936), Brazilian footballer
Jair Marrufo (born 1977), American association football referee 
Jair Nunes (born 1994), Santomean football player
Jair Oliveira (born 1975), Brazilian composer, singer and producer
Jair Pereira (born 1986), Portuguese-Mexican footballer
Jair Pereira (football manager) (born 1946), Brazilian football manager and former player 
Jair Picerni (born 1944), Brazilian football manager and former player
Jair Rosa (born 1975), Uruguayan footballer
Jair da Rosa Pinto (1921–2005), Brazilian footballer 
Jair Reinoso (born 1985), Colombian footballer 
Jair Rodrigues (1939–2014), Brazilian musician and singer
Jair-Rôhm Parker Wells (born 1958), American improvisation bassist, composer and conceptualist
Jair Ventura Filho (born 1944), Brazilian footballer better known as Jairzinho
Jair (footballer, born 3 August 1994), Jair Tavares da Silva, Brazilian football midfielder
Jaïr
Jaïr Karam, French football player and manager

Jahir

Jahir Barraza (born 1990), Mexican football player
Jahir Butrón (born 1975), Peruvian football player
Jahir Khan, Fijian police officer 
Jahir Ocampo (born 1990), Mexican diver

Surname
Shahidul Jahir (1953–2008), Bangladeshi novelist and short story writer

See also
Jahir, disambiguation
Yair (name), Jewish variety

References